Mairin or Máirín may refer to

People
Máirín Cregan (1891–1975), an Irish nationalist and writer
Mairin Mitchell (1895–1986), an Anglo-Irish writer
Máirín de Burca (born 1938), an Irish journalist
Máirín Ní Ghadhra, an Irish broadcaster
Máirín Nic Eoin, an Irish academic

Other
Betulinic acid (alternative name)